Tracy Spiridakos  is a Canadian actress. She starred as Becky Richards on the Teletoon children's comedy series Majority Rules! from 2009–2010. She then starred as Charlotte "Charlie" Matheson on the NBC post-apocalyptic science fiction series Revolution from 2012–2014, for which she was nominated for a Saturn Award for Best Actress on Television. She played Annika Johnson on the A&E television drama Bates Motel. Since 2017, Spiridakos has starred on the NBC police drama Chicago P.D. playing the role of Detective Hailey Upton.

Early life
Spiridakos was born in Winnipeg, Manitoba, to Greek-born parents, restaurant owners George and Anastasia Spiridakos. She has two brothers. The family moved to her father's hometown, Skala, Greece south of Sparta, a few years after she was born, and returned to Canada in 1992. She strongly identifies with her Greek heritage and speaks fluent Greek. Spiridakos began acting in junior high school, and studied at the Actors Training Centre of Manitoba. She graduated from Oak Park High School in Winnipeg in 2000.

Career
Spiridakos moved to Vancouver in 2007 to pursue acting, and within weeks landed her first television role, a small part on Supernatural. She continued working in television, with walk-on roles on Bionic Woman, The L Word, Hellcats, and Psych. Spiridakos appeared in the TV movie Goblin, and the web series Mortal Kombat: Legacy. She also had a recurring role on Being Human as werewolf Brynn McLean.

In 2009, she won her first starring role in the Canadian Teletoon series Majority Rules!, playing 15-year-old Becky Richards. She made her feature film debut in 2011 with Rise of the Planet of the Apes, and filmed the low-budget Michael Greenspan-helmed thriller, Kill for Me, starring across from Donal Logue and Katie Cassidy.  Spiridakos appeared as Sammi in the 2012 Nickelodeon original movie, Rags. She then landed a lead role on the NBC television series Revolution as Charlotte "Charlie" Matheson, a survivalist in a dystopian future civilization. She auditioned for the role while attending her first pilot season in Los Angeles. Spiridakos shot the pilot in Atlanta, and filmed the first season in Wilmington, North Carolina. She was nominated for a Saturn Award for Best Actress on Television for her performance in the first season, losing out to Fringe's Anna Torv. Production moved to Austin, Texas for the series' second season.

Spiridakos guest starred on season 3 of the Showtime sitcom, Episodes, as Dawn, a daughter of character Morning Randolph (Mircea Monroe). In August 2014, Spiridakos helped to raise awareness of the disease ALS by participating in the Ice Bucket Challenge. Spiridakos began a recurring role on the A&E television drama, Bates Motel in 2015, playing Annika Johnson, a prostitute who arrives at the hotel at the start of the third season. She will also star opposite Jonathan Rhys Meyers in the romantic comedy Byrd & the Bees, directed by Finola Hughes. Spiridakos filmed an untitled television pilot for CBS in 2015, directed by Pamela Fryman. She stars as Holly opposite Adam Brody, playing childhood friends who reconnect later in life.

In 2017, Spiridakos appeared in the three final episodes of the fourth season of the NBC police drama series Chicago P.D., as Detective Hailey Upton, a former Robbery-Homicide detective who joins the Intelligence Unit, before being promoted to a series regular for the series' fifth season.

Filmography

Film

Television

Notes

References

External links
 
 

21st-century Canadian actresses
Canadian expatriate actresses in the United States
Canadian film actresses
Canadian people of Greek descent
Canadian television actresses
Living people
Year of birth missing (living people)
Actresses from Winnipeg
People from Laconia